Australia competed at the 2009 World Aquatics Championships in Rome, Italy from 17 July to 2 August 2009.

Diving

Men

Women

Open water swimming

Men

Women

Swimming

Men

Women

Synchronised Swimming

Water polo

Men's tournament
Team roster

Group play

Quarterfinal

9th-12th place semifinal

9th place game

Women's tournament
Roster

Group play

Quarterfinal

5th-8th place semifinal

5th place game

References

Nations at the 2009 World Aquatics Championships
World Aquatics Championships
Australia at the World Aquatics Championships